Ericameria greenei is a species of flowering shrub in the family Asteraceae known by the common name Greene's goldenbush. It is native to the mountains of the western United States in Washington, Idaho, Oregon, and the northern California as far south as Lake and Tuolumne Counties.

Ericameria greenei grows in rocky and open wooded habitat. It is a small shrub growing up to about 25 centimeters (10 inches) tall with branches lined with short, narrow, hairless to glandular, woolly leaves. The inflorescence is a cluster of flower heads at the tips of stem branches. Each head is lined with sticky, glandular phyllaries and contains as many as 20 yellowish disc florets and sometimes a few yellow ray florets but sometimes none. The fruit is an achene topped with a brownish pappus.

References

External links
Jepson Manual Treatment
United States Department of Agriculture Plants Profile
Calphotos Photo gallery, University of California

greenei
Flora of California
Flora of Idaho
Flora of Oregon
Flora of Washington (state)
Flora of the Cascade Range
Flora of the Sierra Nevada (United States)
Natural history of the California Coast Ranges
Plants described in 1880
Taxa named by Asa Gray
Flora without expected TNC conservation status